Cameron Mark Congreve (born 24 January 2004) is a Welsh professional footballer who plays as an attacking midfielder for EFL Championship club Swansea City.

Career
Congreve is a youth product of Swansea City, having joined at U9 level. He was named the Swansea Academy Player of the Year for the 2020–21 season. He signed his first professional contract with Swansea City on 10 March 2022, keeping him at the club until at least 2024. He made his professional debut with Swansea in a 1–0 EFL Championship loss to Blackpool on 12 March 2022.

International career
Congreve is a youth international for Wales, having played for the Wales U18s, having debuted in a 0–0 (2–0) friendly loss to the England U18s on 30 March 2021. On 14 March 2023 he was called up to the Wales national under-21 football team

References

External links
 
 Swansea City profile

2004 births
Living people
Sportspeople from Blaenau Gwent
Welsh footballers
Wales youth international footballers
Swansea City A.F.C. players
English Football League players
Association football midfielders